XHYD-FM is a radio station on 105.1 FM in Francisco I. Madero, Coahuila, Mexico. The station is operated by GPS Media and carries its Capullo FM romantic format.

History
XHYD began as XEYD-AM 1410, with a concession awarded to Alejandro Rodríguez Morán on November 22, 1971. The station migrated to FM in 2011 and sold in 2015.

In 2020, GPS Media was born, taking control of several stations, including XHYD-FM. All of the stations operated by the new group were rebranded.

References

Radio stations in Coahuila
Radio stations in the Comarca Lagunera